Ust-Urolka is a rural locality (a village) in Cherdynsky District, Perm Krai, Russia. The population was 111 as of 2010. There are 6 streets.

Geography 
Ust-Urolka is located 121 km southwest of Cherdyn (the district's administrative centre) by road. Yaranina is the nearest rural locality.

References 

Rural localities in Cherdynsky District